Harrison James Chapman (born 5 November 1997) is an English professional footballer plays as a midfielder for Bradford City.

Club career

Middlesbrough
Chapman signed his first professional contract with Championship club Middlesbrough in January 2015. Chapman played for Boro during the 2015–16 UEFA Youth League,  contributing eight assists and three goals in six games – more assists than any other player in the competition.

Barnsley (loan) 
On 26 February 2016, he joined League One side Barnsley until the end of the 2015–16 season; "Tykes" manager Paul Heckingbottom said that the club were lucky to sign Chapman. He made his debut in the Football League the following day, coming on for Lloyd Isgrove 73 minutes into a 2–1 win over Crewe Alexandra at Gresty Road. He scored his first senior goal on 5 March, in a 3–1 victory over Walsall at the Bescot Stadium. On 3 April, Chapman was a late substitute as Barnsley won the 2016 Football League Trophy Final. Chapman was in the squad that won the 2016 Football League play-offs at Wembley Stadium on 29 May.

Sheffield United (loan) 
On 12 August 2016, Chapman joined Sheffield United on a season-long loan. He scored his first goal for the club in a 1–0 win over Bristol Rovers on 27 September 2016. Chapman then went on to score the first hat-trick of his professional career in a 6–0 FA Cup win against Leyton Orient. However, in November 2016 he picked up an injury that would lead him to the end of his loan spell with the Blades in January 2017. It was agreed on 31 January 2017 that his loan spell would be renewed and he would rejoin the Blades upon his rehabilitation.

Blackburn Rovers (loan) 
On 4 August 2017, Chapman completed a loan move to Blackburn Rovers for the 2017–18 season.

Blackburn Rovers
On 28 January 2019, Chapman signed a permanent contract with Blackburn Rovers on a 2½-year deal.

On 20 May 2022, Blackburn announced Chapman would be departing the club upon the expiry of his contract on 30 June.

Shrewsbury Town (loan) 
On 31 December 2020, Chapman joined League One club Shrewsbury Town on a six-month loan until the end of the season. On 31 January, Chapman netted twice in a 2–0 win at home to Peterborough United. Three days later, in what Crewe Alexandra manager David Artell described as "a horrific tackle", Chapman broke the leg of Crewe forward Oliver Finney; he was yellow-carded for the foul, though Artell said the referee’s assessor thought it "was probably a red card [offence]". He scored seven goals in 24 appearances for the Shropshire side.

Burton Albion (loan) 
On 31 August 2021, Chapman joined League One club Burton Albion on a six-month loan until 2 January 2022. He made 15 appearances for Burton, scoring once - in his final appearance, a 4–1 win against Crewe Alexandra on 1 January 2022.

Bradford City 
On 17 June 2022, Chapman signed a permanent contract with Bradford City on a 2-year deal.

International career
Chapman has represented England at U18 level. He was selected for the England under-20 team in the 2017 FIFA U-20 World Cup, but was an unused substitute in the tournament that England won.

Career statistics

Honours
Barnsley
Football League Trophy: 2015–16
Football League One play-offs: 2016

Sheffield United
EFL League One: 2016–17

Blackburn Rovers
EFL League One runner-up: 2017–18

England U20
FIFA U-20 World Cup: 2017

References

External links

England profile at The Football Association

1997 births
Living people
Footballers from Hartlepool
English footballers
England youth international footballers
Association football wingers
Middlesbrough F.C. players
Barnsley F.C. players
Sheffield United F.C. players
Blackburn Rovers F.C. players
Shrewsbury Town F.C. players
English Football League players
Burton Albion F.C. players